99 Posse is an Italian hip hop/reggae group from Naples. It raps both in Italian and in the local Neapolitan language. Most of 99 Posse's songs deal with political or social issues, and the group members are considered left-wing hardliners. As a showing of their activism, all of the group's albums have been released with a prezzo politico ("political price"): each CD displays a sticker saying "Don't pay more than...". For 99 Posse, this means "putting into practice a specific understanding about their relationship with the market, a sort of ideal practice." The group has gained popularity in Italy through its songs and its voicing of progressive political causes.

Its first album, Curre Curre Guagliò (1993), was mainly influenced by reggae and world music. Subsequent albums, Cerco Tiempo (1996) and Corto Circuito (1998), included new styles like drum 'n bass and trip hop. Curre Curre Guaglio was self-produced, but rose from its underground status to become an iconic album and cultural manifesto that eventually inspired the film Sud by Oscar-winning director Gabriele Salvatores. The group also has its own record label, Novenove, which works to promote underground artists.

On 18 July 2009 they came back without Meg in Naples, during a concert created by movements against repression and the blocking of 21 activists for G8 in Turin's university.

Band members

Members as of 2021

Former members 
Luca "'O Zulù" Persico – vocals
Marco "Kaya Pezz8" Messina – sampler and dub master
Massimo "JRM" Jovine – bass
Sacha Ricci – keyboard
Claudio "Clark Kent" Marino – drums
Maria "Meg" Di Donna – vocals

Discography

Studio albums

Live albums

References

Bibliography 
Behan, Tom. (2007) Putting spanners in the works: the politics of the 99 Posse. Popular Music 26.03, 497-504.
Cavallo, Vincenzo; Chambers, Iain. (n.d.). "Neapolitan Nights: from Vesuvian Blues to Planetary Vibes"
Dello Iacovo, Rosario. (2014) Curre curre guagliò: Storie dei 99 Posse. Milan: Baldini&Castoldi.
Dines, Nick. (1999) "Centri sociali: occupazioni autogestite a Napoli negli anni novanta", Quaderni di sociologia, 43(21), 90-111.
Messina, Marcello. (2016) "Cattivi guagliuni: the identity politics of 99 Posse". In P. Guerra, & T. Moreira (Eds.), Keep it Simple, Make it Fast! An approach to underground music scenes, Vol. 2, (pp. 131-136). Porto: University of Porto. Faculty of Arts and Humanities.
Pugliese, Joseph. (2008). "Whiteness and the blackening of Italy: La guerra cafona, extracomunitari and provisional street justice". PORTAL Journal of Multidisciplinary International Studies, 5(2).

Italian hip hop groups
Italian communists
Ciak d'oro winners